Brian Barish is an American financial and investment manager.  He is president  of the Denver based investment firm Cambiar Investors, LLC.  He has been the portfolio manager of the Cambiar Opportunity Fund, a mutual fund that, as of February 2007, has outperformed the S&P 500 stock market index eight years in a row.  He has been rated by The Motley Fool.

Barish has a degree in economics from the University of California, Berkeley.

References

External links

Official Cambiar Investors profile

Living people
Year of birth missing (living people)
American financial businesspeople
UC Berkeley College of Letters and Science alumni